The terms Old Boys and Old Girls are the usual expressions in use in the United Kingdom for former pupils of primary and secondary schools. While these are traditionally associated with independent schools, they are also used for some schools in the state sector. The term is also used for those who attended schools in the Commonwealth realm, a few universities in the UK and, to a lesser extent, schools in Australia, Canada,  Republic of Ireland, South Africa and Spain.

The Old Boy form is given a specific identification for each school. Some schools use an adjectival form of the school name, such as "Old Etonian", "Old Harrovian", or "Old Oundelian" (old boys of Eton College, Harrow School, and Oundle School). Some use a Latin form derived from the Latin name of the school or its location as "Old Novaportan" (old boys of Adams' Grammar School, Newport, Shropshire). Some are based on the name of the founder, such as "Old Wykehamist" and "Old Alleynian" (for old boys of Winchester College, founded by William of Wykeham, and Dulwich College, founded by Edward Alleyn). Some are based on the school's location or street, such as "Old Gowers" (for University College School, originally in Gower Street). Many of the schools have histories dating back several hundred years, and the Old Boy forms may have been in use for a hundred years or more. Other more recently established schools have devised Old Boy names that are distinctive to prevent confusion with other schools. The tradition for many girls' schools has been to use the term "Seniors" rather than "Old Girls".

Almost all of these schools have old boy associations that use the official name. Some schools have amalgamated or been renamed through various transformations, but they usually maintain a consistent name for their old boy associations. Many of these schools have teams that compete nationally in sports such as cricket, rugby union, association football, field hockey and golf, and these teams are usually referred to by the standard Old Boy name, although some also have nicknames. In deference to this tradition, the standard "Old Boys" is often used for sporting clubs and used as part of many sporting associations and clubs worldwide. Examples include Argentine football club Newell's Old Boys, New Zealand rugby union club High School Old Boys RFC and Swiss football club BSC Old Boys.

Lists of schools and old boy associations

India

New Zealand

Sri Lanka

South Africa

Spain

United States

United Kingdom

See also 
 Old boy network
 Old school tie

References 

People educated by school in the United Kingdom